Eli Baker (born September 27, 2001) is an American actor, known for playing the role of Henry Fisher in the TV series Growing Up Fisher. He is the son of Jessie and David Baker.

Filmography

References

External links
 
  

2001 births
American male child actors
Living people